The Montana Libertarian Party is the Montana affiliate of the Libertarian Party. In 2012, Mike Fellows made history by becoming the first Libertarian in national LP history to achieve 40 percent in a partisan statewide race.

Chairs 
 Larry Dodge
 Mike Fellows (until 2016)
 Ron Vandevender (2016–2017)
 Elinor Swanson (2017)
 Michael Fucci (2017–2018)
 Francis Wendt (2018–2019)
 Sid Daoud (2019–present)

See also
 Montana Democratic Party
 Montana Republican Party
 Green Party of Montana
 Don Doig

References

External links
 Libertarian Party of Montana

Montana
Political parties in Montana
1971 establishments in Montana